The San Juan Raya Formation is a geologic formation in Mexico. It preserves fossils dating back to the Albian and Aptian stages of the Early Cretaceous period.

See also 
 List of fossiliferous stratigraphic units in Mexico

References 

Geologic formations of Mexico
Lower Cretaceous Series of North America
Cretaceous Mexico
Albian Stage
Aptian Stage
Sandstone formations
Shale formations
Mudstone formations
Deltaic deposits
Fluvial deposits
Lagoonal deposits
Shallow marine deposits
Ichnofossiliferous formations
Paleontology in Mexico